is a Japanese actress.

Career
Hiiragi first appeared in numerous commercials. She starred in the NHK asadora  and voiced Chihiro in Hayao Miyazaki's award-winning anime film Spirited Away. In 2002, she appeared in the high school baseball television program Netto Koshien as a field reporter. In 2005, she appeared in the NTV program Nobuta o Produce, portraying the character Kasumi Aoi.

Filmography

Television

Films

References

External links

 

Japanese child actresses
Japanese television actresses
Asadora lead actors
Living people
1987 births
People from Tokyo